Blackall was a Legislative Assembly electorate in the state of Queensland from 1873 to 1888.

History

Blackall was established in 1873 as a single-member constituency by the 1872 Electoral Districts Act and covered the rural surrounding areas of Rockhampton from the coast to the ranges. It was abolished in the 1887 redistribution, being split up into two new electorates, Electoral district of Fitzroy and Electoral district of Rockhampton North, and the existing Electoral district of Normanby.

Members

The following representatives were elected to the seat of Blackall:

See also
 Electoral districts of Queensland
 Members of the Queensland Legislative Assembly by year
 :Category:Members of the Queensland Legislative Assembly by name

References

Former electoral districts of Queensland
1873 establishments in Australia
1888 disestablishments in Australia
Constituencies established in 1873
Constituencies disestablished in 1888